5-Ethyl-N,N-dimethyltryptamine is a tryptamine derivative which acts as an agonist at the 5-HT1A and 5-HT1D serotonin receptors, with around 3x selectivity for 5-HT1D.

See also 
 5-Benzyloxytryptamine
 5-Carboxamidotryptamine
 5-Ethoxy-DMT
 5-Methyl-DMT
 Sumatriptan

References 

Serotonin receptor agonists
Tryptamines
Dimethylamino compounds